, alternately romanized as Kinhwa, is a prefecture-level city in central Zhejiang province in eastern China. It borders the provincial capital of Hangzhou to the northwest, Quzhou to the southwest, Lishui to the south, Taizhou to the east, and Shaoxing to the northeast. Its population was 7,050,683 as of the 2020 census including 1,463,990 in the built-up (or metro) area made of two urban districts (not including yet the satellite city of Lanxi, which has become essentially a suburban offshoot of Jinhua's main urban area).

Jinhua is rich in red soil and forest resources. The Jinhua or Wu River flows through the Lan and Fuchun to the Qiantang River beside Hangzhou, which flows into Hangzhou Bay and the East China Sea. In medieval China, it formed part of the water network feeding supplies to the southern end of the Grand Canal. It is best known for its dry-cured Jinhua ham.

History and culture
The history of Jinhua dates back to the 2nd century BC, when it was a county subordinate to Shaoxing. It was given the name Jinhua under the Sui dynasty in AD 598 and later became the seat of a prefecture. The present city and its walls date to the Yuan dynasty in 1352.

The most famous native of Jinhua is Huang Chuping, a Daoist holy man of the 4th century and reputed immortal whose descendants still live in the area. Wuyang Shan ("Reclining Sheep Mountain") is said to be a sheep which was turned to stone by Huang, a trick which he learned through his years of diligently studying Daoism.

Economically Jinhua has always prospered from its position as the regional collecting and processing center for agricultural and forestry products (chiefly rice and bamboo). It is currently the second most important grain producing area in Zhejiang. In 1985 Jinhua was promoted to City status, and now is responsible for administering four cities, four counties and a district. Animals raised there include dairy cattle, meat hogs (for the production of Jinhua ham, a famous local product for 900 years) and honeybees. Jinhua's industrial sector has developed more recently, producing machinery, metallurgy, pharmaceuticals, building supplies and electrical and electronic equipment.

The Tang dynasty painter Guan Xiu (Kuan-hsiu) was born in Jinhua. He is known for his paintings of Buddhist holy men.

There are numerous scenic and historical sites in the Jinhua region, including many places associated with the Immortal Huang, and a palace of the Dukes of the
Taiping Heavenly Kingdom.

In October 2021, the establishment of Ling on the township will be abolished, the former Ling on the township on the hall village, after Fan village, Qunle a village, Qunle two villages, after the village, Baisan village, high pond village and other 7 administrative villages to Tashi Township, the former Ling on the township under the dock village, Ling on the village, Huang Yan Kong village, Jiang Fan village, Huang Ma Shan village, Limen Temple village, Shibutou village, East will village, Su village, Shaojiayuan village and other 10 administrative villages (has been abolished) regional scope to be assigned to Tangxi Township. After the adjustment, Tashi Township has jurisdiction over 22 administrative villages, the township government in Tashi Village; Tangxi Township has jurisdiction over 39 administrative villages, 1 community, the township government in Tangxi Village, No. 49, Chengzhong Road.

Geography

Jinhua is located at latitudes 28° 32'−29° 41' N and longitudes 119° 14'−120° 46' E in the center of Zhejiang. It borders Hangzhou to the northwest, Quzhou to the southwest, Lishui to the south, Taizhou to the east, and Shaoxing to the northeast.

Climate
Jinhua has a humid subtropical climate (Köppen Cfa) with four distinctive seasons, characterised by hot, humid summers and chilly, cloudy and drier winters (with occasional snow).

Administrative divisions

The prefecture-level city of Jinhua administers 9 county-level divisions, including 2 districts, 4 county-level cities and 3 counties.

These are further divided into 191 township-level divisions, including 107 towns, 73 townships and 11 subdistricts.

Economy
Jinhua has a rather flexible economic system with distinctive economic characteristics in different areas.  90% of enterprises are in and about 88% of its GDP are from private sector.

Industry

Jinhua enjoys an advanced civilian-owned economy, with its industry mainly supported by processing and manufacturing. Leading industries of the city include clothing and textile, mechanics and electronics, pharmacy and chemistry, manufacturing crafts, metalwork processing architecture and building materials, automobile-and-motorcycle accessories, food processing, and plastic ware.

Industries are distributed with different characteristics in different counties or county-level cities. For instance, Yiwu is characterized by its light-industry commodities, Yongkang by its automobile-and-motorcycle accessories and mechanical and electric tools, Dongyang by its clothing, architecture and magnetic materials, the Jinhua Proper by its pharmacy, construction materials and industrial measures, Lanxi by its non-ferrous metal, cement, towels and daily chemicals, and Pujiang by its textile, lockmaking, and lantern ornaments of crystals.

Handicrafts
Traditional handicrafts have been flourishing in Jinhua. The wood carving and bamboo weaving in Dongyang, the straw plaiting, lace purling and crystals carving in Pujiang, and the hardware crafts in Yongkang, all enjoy a long history of development and the products sell well both abroad and at home.

Education 
Jinhua hosts the Zhejiang Normal University (ZJNU), a public university in China. Key provincial public high schools in Jinhua include Zhejiang Dongyang High School, Yiwu High School, Jinhua No. 1 High School, Jinhua Foreign Language School, High School Affiliated to Zhejiang Normal University, Lanxi No. 1 High School, Zhejiang Pujiang High School, Aiqing High School, Yongkang No. 1 Senior Middle School, and Jinhua Tangxi Senior High School.

Many education cooperations happen in Jinhua. Jinhua has been leading China-Africa education cooperation since the 1980s with the help of colleges and universities. Zhejiang Normal University began to recruit short-term international students in China in the 1980s. To date, the university has trained more than 8,000 African students in the Chinese language, international education in Chinese, business administration, comparative education, software engineering, mechanical design, and manufacturing and automation.

Cuisine

Jinhua Ham 
Jinhua ham has bright colors, with red and white hues. The lean meat has a sweetness, while the fat imparts a flavor without being overly greasy. It is a rich source of protein, fat, multiple vitamins and minerals. Jinhua ham is produced during winter and matured throughout the summer, which allows for fermentation and decomposition, rendering its nutrients more easily absorbed by the human body. Its consumption is associated with various health benefits, such as nourishing the stomach and kidneys, strengthening bone marrow, and promoting wound healing.

Jinhua ham features thin skin, with bright yellow skin and a lute-like shape. Its flesh is red and aromatic, earning it the reputation of the "four perfections" for its combination of color, fragrance, taste, and shape.

Yongkang meat patties 
Yongkang meat patties represent a traditional snack hailing from Yongkang, Jinhua. Throughout Yongkang's history, local farmers have prepared meat patties as a staple dish during harvest festivals. Despite its coarse appearance, Yongkang meat patties are regarded and deemed as an example of the idiom "Don't judge a book by its cover."

Yongkang meat patties are generally divided into two types. One is the thin patty (also known as the triangle patty), which is flat and large in area. The whole thin patty is cut into several triangle patties and sold with pork and dried vegetable filling. The other is the thick patty, a thicker, smaller patty filled with potato, tofu, cowpea, lotus root, etc.

Transportation

Rail 

Main railway stations: 
Jinhua railway station
Jinhua South railway station
Yiwu railway station

Jinhua enjoys convenient transportation, being the communications center in southeast China between coastal and inland areas. It is one of the major hubs of land transportation in the country. The Zhejiang-Jiangxi, Jinhua-Wenzhou and Jinhua-Qiandaohu railways intersect in the city. The Hangzhou-Jinhua-Quzhou Expressway, the Jinhua-Lishui-Wenzhou Expressway, the No. 330 and 320 National Highways, and other provincial highroads traverse the area. The city aggregation around Jinhua Proper has formed a "Half-an-Hour's-Ride Economic Circle", there being merely a 90-minute and a 3-hour journey driving from the city to Hangzhou and Shanghai respectively.

Metro 
Jinhua Rail Transit is a metro system in Jinhua, Yiwu and Dongyang. It was opened on August 30, 2022.

Air 
Yiwu Airport offers airlines destined for Beijing, Shanghai, Guangzhou, Shenzhen, Xiamen, Qingdao, and Hong Kong.

Landmarks 
Jinhua Architecture Park, a collection of 17 pavilions designed by Chinese and international architects, is set on the banks of the Yiwu River.

Notable people 
 Chen Wei
 Guo Guangchang
 Hu Hailan
 Pan Jianwei
 Lou Jiwei

See also 
 Jinhua ham

References

External links
Government website of Jinhua 
Government website of Jinhua
Jinhua First Social Welfare Institute (orphanage)
The Jinhua Swine, breeds of livestock

 
Cities in Zhejiang
Prefecture-level divisions of Zhejiang